The  2022 Novak Djokovic tennis season officially began on 21 February 2022, with the start of the Dubai Tennis Championships.
During this season, Djokovic:
 Surpassed his record of 353 weeks as the ATP No. 1 to 373.
 Surpassed his records of 37 ATP Masters 1000 titles to 38 & finals reached from 54 to 56.
 Surpassed his record of 229 wins over top 10 ranked players to 240.
 Surpassed his record of 28 grand slam first place seedings to 31.
 Surpassed his record of 31 (previously tied with Federer) Grand Slam finals to 32.
 Became first player to record 80+ singles wins at all Grand Slams.
 Became first player to record 30+ singles wins at all ATP Masters 1000.
 Tied Federer for most ATP Finals titles at 6.
 Became record holder for the highest career winning percentage (minimum 500 wins) at 83.35% (1031–206 record).
 Lost the (previously tied with Federer & Nadal's) all-time record total of 20 men's singles major titles to Nadal (22).

Yearly summary

Early hard court season

ATP Cup

Djokovic withdrew from the Serbian team taking part at the ATP Cup from 1 January in Sydney.

Australian Open

Djokovic received a COVID-19 vaccination exemption from Tennis Australia to enter into the Australian Open. The exemption was provided after a rigorous review process involving two separate independent panels of medical experts, including the Independent Medical Exemption Review Panel appointed by the Victoria Department of Health. The panels applied the guidelines set by the Australian Technical Advisory Group on Immunisation. The basis for the exemption was that Djokovic had contracted COVID-19 in the past 6 months. Djokovic's participation in the Australian Open was cast into doubt after the Australian Border Force questioned the basis for the exemption. He was detained by the Australian Border Force on 5 January, and his visa was cancelled on the same day, with plans for his deportation being put in place. His lawyers challenged the decision. The Federal Circuit and Family Court ruled against the government on procedural grounds and ordered his release from detention and directed the federal government to pay his legal expenses.

On 14 January 2022, Alex Hawke, the Australian Minister for Immigration, Citizenship, Migrant Services and Multicultural Affairs, exercised his ministerial powers under sections 133C(3) and 116(1)(e)(i) of the Migration Act 1958 to cancel Djokovic's visa, citing "health and good order grounds, on the basis that it was in the public interest to do so". Djokovic's application for judicial review in the Federal Court was unanimously dismissed by the full court with costs on 16 January. Djokovic said he was "extremely disappointed" with the decision but accepted the ruling, and flew out of Australia that night. "Lucky loser" Salvatore Caruso took his place in the Australian Open draw.

In late January, doubts continued to mount over the validity of the date of his COVID test. Nevertheless, Djokovic entered into the 2022 Dubai Tennis Championships, an ATP 500 tournament where he has been seeded first. The tournament is due to be held in February; vaccination is not a requirement for entry into Dubai.

Dubai Tennis Championships

Djokovic played his first tournament of the season in Dubai after his deportation from Australia.  He defeated Lorenzo Musetti and Karen Khachanov in straight sets. He then lost in the quarterfinals to Jiří Veselý in straight sets, thus losing his number 1 ranking to Daniil Medvedev.

Indian Wells Masters

Djokovic withdrew from the tournament due to COVID-19 vaccine mandate rules from entering the United States. Despite this, Djokovic regained the number 1 ranking after Gaël Monfils beat Daniil Medvedev in the third round.

Miami Open

Djokovic withdrew from the tournament due to vaccine mandate rules from entering the United States.

Clay court season

Monte-Carlo Masters

After getting a bye in the first round, Djokovic lost in the second round to eventual runner-up Alejandro Davidovich Fokina.

Serbia Open

In his first match he was down a set and a break to compatriot Laslo Đere, and 2 points from defeat in the second set tiebreak, but fought through to win in a final set tiebreak. In his quarterfinal match he came from a set and a break down to win for the second straight match against compatriot Miomir Kecmanović. In the semis he won a third straight match from a set down against Karen Khachanov to reach his first ATP final of 2022. In the finals he forced a third set from a set down for the 4th match in a row but ultimately ran out of gas and was bageled 0-6 in the final set. Rublev won the title, defeating Djokovic 6–2, 6–7(4–7), 6–0.

Madrid Open

Defeating Gaël Monfils for a record 18th time, Djokovic was supposed to play Andy Murray in the round of 16 but Murray withdrew due to food poisoning. He beat Hubert Hurkacz in the quarterfinals.  In the semifinals he faced Carlos Alcaraz, who beat Nadal the day before. In a very tightly contested battle which lasted over 3 and a half hours, eventual champion Alcaraz prevailed 7–5 in the third set tiebreak and won the match 6–7, 7–5, 7–6.

Italian Open

Djokovic defeated Aslan Karatsev, Stan Wawrinka, Félix Auger-Aliassime, Casper Ruud and Stefanos Tsitsipas, all in straight sets en route to winning the title, his first of 2022, 38th Masters 1000 title overall, and 6th in Rome.

French Open

Djokovic, the defending champion, cruised through the first 4 rounds against Nishioka, Molcan (coached by Marián Vajda, Djokovic's former coach), Bedene and Schwartzman without losing a set. He entered his quarterfinal match having won 22 sets in a row, where he faced Rafael Nadal. Nadal prevailed in a close four set battle that lasted over four hours, 6–2, 4–6, 6–2, 7–6(7–4), and went on to win his 14th French Open title (and 22nd overall Grand Slam) five days later, leaving Djokovic two behind the all time lead. Djokovic lost the number 1 ranking to Medvedev after failing to defend the title.

Grass court season

Wimbledon

Djokovic entered the tournament as the three-time defending champion. In the first round he beat Soon-woo Kwon in 4 sets, cruised to the quarterfinals with straight set wins against Thanasi Kokkinakis and compatriot Kecmanović, and defeated Tim Van Rijthoven in the fourth round in 4 sets. In the quarterfinals he would complete a 7th comeback from two sets down to prevail in five sets against Jannik Sinner.  In the semis he beat the British #1 Cameron Norrie in 4 sets from a set down.  Djokovic faced Nick Kyrgios in the final, the Australian playing his first ever major final.  Kyrgios entered the match 2–0 against Djokovic, having never lost a match, a set, or any service games to Djokovic. In a tight 4 set final, Djokovic fought from a set down to prevail in 4 sets, 4–6, 6–3, 6–4, 7–6, for his 7th Wimbledon title, just one behind Roger Federer, and 21st grand slam title, overtaking Federer, and putting him within one of Nadal's total. For the first time in his career Djokovic won a slam event four straight times (2018, 2019, 2021 and 2022; 2020 was cancelled due to the COVID-19 pandemic).

Fall hard court season

Djokovic was forced to withdraw from the Canadian Open in Montreal, Western and Southern Open in Cincinnati, and the US Open. He was not eligible to enter both Canada and the United States due to being unvaccinated as both countries mandated foreigners to be vaccinated to cross the border at the time of these tournaments.

Laver Cup

Djokovic won a doubles match alongside Matteo Berrettini, and a singles match against Frances Tiafoe. He lost to Auger-Aliassime in the second last singles match, and Team World went on to claim their first ever Laver Cup title, 13–8. This tournament even marked the retirement of Tennis legend and Djokovic's longtime rival Roger Federer, who played his last tournament.

Tel Aviv Open

Djokovic beat Pablo Andujar, Vasek Pospisil, Roman Safiullin and Marin Čilić to win the title without the loss of a set at the Tel Aviv Open.

Astana Open

Djokovic cruised past Cristian Garín, Botic van de Zandschulp and Karen Khachanov to reach the semis without losing a set.  In the semis he faced Medvedev, who was two points from the win in the second set tiebreak which Djokovic won 8–6. Medvedev immediately retired from the match, telling Djokovic he sustained an adductor injury. Djokovic beat Tsitsipas in the final in straight sets for his 90th career title. With this win, he qualified for the 2022 ATP Finals, as he only needed to finish in the Top 20 of the Race to Turin, since he won a Grand Slam in 2022.

Paris Masters

Djokovic started as 6th seed. In opening 3 rounds he beat Maxime Cressy, Karen Khachanov and Lorenzo Musetti comfortably. In semifinals, he beat Stefanos Tsitsipas in third set tiebreaker to extend the masters finals record to 56. In final, he faced 19 year old Holger Rune who was in his first masters 1000 final. Rune won in three set to win his first masters title. It was the first time Djokovic lost a Masters 1000 final after winning the first set.

ATP Finals

Djokovic was put in the red group along with Stefanos Tsitsipas, Daniil Medvedev and Andrey Rublev. In the opening round, he beat Tsitsipas in 2 sets. In second round, he beat Rublev to qualify for semifinal for 11th time. In the final dead rubber, Djokovic took on Medvedev in a match that lasted 3hr 11mins. Djokovic was the only player who hadn't lost a match while reaching semifinals. In the semis, he beat Taylor Fritz in tight 2 sets. Djokovic remained unbeaten in the final beating world no.3 Casper Ruud. For winning the title unbeaten, Djokovic won $4,740,300 which is the most prize money for a single tournament in tennis history. Djokovic equaled Roger Federer's record by winning the title for 6th time. Djokovic also became the oldest winner of ATP finals at 35 years 6 months; the record was previously held by Federer at 30 years and 4 months. Djokovic also won the most prize money for 2022, and tied for first with the most titles in 2022 (5).

All matches

This table lists all the matches of Djokovic this year, including walkovers (W/O)

Singles matches

Doubles matches

Exhibition matches

Singles

Schedule
Per Novak Djokovic, this is his current 2022 schedule (subject to change).

Singles schedule

Doubles schedule

Yearly records

Head-to-head matchups
Novak Djokovic has a  ATP match win–loss record in the 2022 season. Bold indicates player was ranked top 10 at the time of at least one meeting. The following list is ordered by number of wins:

  Karen Khachanov 4–0
  Stefanos Tsitsipas 4–0
  Miomir Kecmanović 2–0
  Daniil Medvedev 2–0
  Lorenzo Musetti 2–0
  Casper Ruud 2–0
  Pablo Andújar 1–0
  Aljaž Bedene 1–0
  Marin Čilić 1–0
  Maxime Cressy  1–0
  Laslo Đere 1–0
  Taylor Fritz 1–0
  Cristian Garín 1–0
  Hubert Hurkacz 1–0
  Aslan Karatsev 1–0
  Thanasi Kokkinakis 1–0
  Nick Kyrgios 1–0
  Alex Molčan 1–0
  Gaël Monfils 1–0
  Yoshihito Nishioka 1–0
  Cameron Norrie 1–0
  Vasek Pospisil 1–0
  Roman Safiullin 1–0
  Diego Schwartzman 1–0
  Jannik Sinner 1–0
  Kwon Soon-woo 1–0
  Frances Tiafoe  1–0
  Botic van de Zandschulp 1–0
  Tim van Rijthoven 1–0
  Stan Wawrinka 1–0
  Félix Auger-Aliassime 1–1
  Andrey Rublev 1–1
  Carlos Alcaraz 0–1
  Alejandro Davidovich Fokina 0–1
  Rafael Nadal 0–1
  Holger Rune 0–1
  Jiří Veselý 0–1

* Statistics correct .

Finals

Singles: 7 (5 titles, 2 runner-ups)

Top 10 wins

Earnings
Bold font denotes tournament win

 Figures in United States dollars (USD) unless noted. 
source：2022 Singles Activity
source：2022 Doubles Activity

See also

 2022 ATP Tour
 2022 Rafael Nadal tennis season
 2022 Daniil Medvedev tennis season
 2022 Carlos Alcaraz tennis season

Notes

References

External links
  
 ATP tour profile

Novak Djokovic tennis seasons
Djokovic
2022 in Serbian sport